Luckenbach is an unincorporated community 13 miles (19 km) from Fredericksburg in southeastern Gillespie County, Texas. Named for German nobleman Jakob Luckenbach, who helped settle the Texas Hill Country in 1845, Luckenbach is known as a venue for country music and for its German-Texan heritage.

History
On December 15, 1847, a petition was submitted to create Gillespie County. In 1848, the Texas Legislature formed Gillespie County from Bexar and Travis Counties. 
Its oldest building is a combination general store and saloon reputedly opened in 1849 (1886 is more likely, based on land improvement records of the Texas State Library and Archives Commission) by Minna Engel, whose father was an itinerant minister from Germany. The community, first named Grape Creek (perhaps really a faulty spelling of "Gap Creek", the literal meaning of "Luckenbach" in German), was later renamed after Engel's husband, Carl Albert Luckenbach. They later moved to another town that became Albert, Texas. Luckenbach was first established as a community trading post, one of a few that never broke a peace treaty with the Comanche Indians, with whom they traded.

Citizens of the town claim a resident (Jacob Brodbeck) launched the first airplane years before the Wright Brothers.

Luckenbach's population increased to a high of 492 in 1904, but by the 1960s it was almost a ghost town. A newspaper advertisement offering "town — pop. 3 — for sale" led actor Guich Koock and Hondo Crouch, a rancher and Texas folklorist, to buy Luckenbach for $30,000 in 1970, in partnership with Kathy Morgan. Hondo's wife, Shatzi, paid for the town, and Guich's wife, Patricia, worked as the bartender and bookkeeper giving their husbands all the glory. Guich used the town's rights as a municipality to govern the dance hall as he saw fit. The town has been host to many unique festivals including the Luckenbach Women's Chili Cookoff and The 1st Luckenbach World's Fair, where Willie Nelson made a surprise appearance. In the 1990s, the town was host to several of Willie Nelson's Fourth of July Picnics.

Modern Luckenbach 
Today Luckenbach maintains a ghost-town feel with its small population and strong western aesthetic. One of its few main buildings houses the remnants of a post office, a working saloon, and a general store. The other is the dance hall. A recent addition to the town is a new store where guests can find top quality western apparel and "Luckenbach" logo shirts including merchandise featuring the town's motto "Everybody's Somebody in Luckenbach" and other memorabilia. The post office was closed on April 30, 1971, and its zip code (78647) was retired. The general store remains active as a souvenir shop where visitors can purchase a variety of snacks, drinks, postcards, T-shirts, sarcastic and humorous signs, and the local newspaper, the 8-page monthly Luckenbach Moon,  and other souvenir items. In the back of the General Store is a small saloon with a selection of beer and wine.

Geography
The Luckenbach website lists "412 Luckenbach Town Loop, Fredericksburg, TX 78624" as the physical address for GPS navigation.

Climate
The climate in this area is characterized by hot, humid summers and generally mild to cool winters. According to the Köppen climate classification system, Stonewall has a humid subtropical climate, Cfa on climate maps.

Notable people

Lt. Colonel Alfred P.C. Petsch—(1887–1981) Lawyer, legislator, civic leader, and philanthropist born in Luckenbach. Served in the Texas House of Representatives, World War I, and World War II.

Guinness world record 
"Pickin' for the Record" was a fundraiser held in Luckenbach on August 23, 2009, for the organization Voices of a Grateful Nation. The Guinness world record was broken for the most guitar players gathered at one time to play continuously for at least five minutes. The Luckenbach record broke the standing German record by 50, with the official count at 1,868. The day before the Texas event, Elvis Presley’s guitar player made a similar attempt in Louisiana but only signed up 800 pickers.

Visiting
Luckenbach hosts live music events each weekend. On Sundays, it is common for visitors to bring instruments and take turns performing informally with others in the crowd. Occasionally, local and regional celebrities drop by. There are recreational vehicle camping spots nearby, along with a small creek. Areas are also set up for washer pitching.

Popular culture
Waylon Jennings famously referenced the town in his song "Luckenbach, Texas (Back to the Basics of Love)". Although Jennings neither favored the song nor had he ever traveled to Luckenbach, he recorded it nonetheless; it became a #1 country hit and even made it to #25 on the pop charts, making it one of his biggest hits.
The country band, Midland references the town in their song "She's a Cowgirl", from their soundtrack album The Sonic Ranch.
 The horror film The Naked Witch was filmed in Luckenbach in 1960. It was directed by Larry Buchanan.
 Glam metal band Warrant (American band), with lead singer Jani Lane, mentions Luckenbach in the song "Love in Stereo" from the 1990 album Cherry Pie (album): "Fresh out of Luckenbach, Texas, I didn't expect that pair."
 Luckenbach was the setting for the short lived sitcom Lewis and Clark, which co-starred town owner Guich Koock and Gabe Kaplan.
Jerry Jeff Walker recorded his live album ¡Viva Terlingua! in Luckenbach in August, 1973.

See also
Luckenbach School

References

External links 

 
Official site for Luckenbach and the Luckenbach Dance Hall
Texas town rooted in country music, a November 2004 CNN article (from web archives)
Luckenbach, Texas lyrics

Unincorporated communities in Gillespie County, Texas
Unincorporated communities in Texas
Ghost towns in Central Texas